Fred A. Bantz (June 25, 1895 – September 22, 1982) was an official in the United States Department of the Navy during the administration of President Dwight D. Eisenhower. He served as Under Secretary of the Navy from 1959 to 1961.

Biography
A native of Saint Paul, Minnesota, Bantz joined J. C. Penney in 1922 as a buyer. He rose through the ranks, becoming a J. C. Penney vice president in 1950.

In 1957, President Dwight D. Eisenhower appointed Bantz as Assistant Secretary of the Navy (Material), a post he held until 1959. At that time, President Eisenhower nominated Bantz as Under Secretary of the Navy and he served in that capacity from June 8, 1959 to January 20, 1961.

Bantz was active in charity work in the 1960s, serving as chairman of the fundraising committees of the American Red Cross and the American Cancer Society.

He died at his home in Delray Beach, Florida on September 22, 1982, at the age of 87.

References
 Obituary in The New York Times, September 25, 1982

1895 births
1982 deaths
People from Delray Beach, Florida
United States Under Secretaries of the Navy
United States Assistant Secretaries of the Navy
Eisenhower administration personnel